École de L'Aviation de Transport 319 Capitaine Jean Dartiques is a French Air and Space Force (Armée de l'air et de l'espace) Transport Aviation School located at Avord Air Base, Cher, France which operates the Embraer EMB 121 Xingu.

See also

 List of French Air and Space Force aircraft squadrons

References

French Air and Space Force squadrons